Ietas (or Iaitas or Iaeta or Ietae or Jetae), was an ancient town of the interior of Sicily, in the northwest of the island, not very far from Panormus (modern Palermo), in the modern comune of San Giuseppe Jato, whose name reflects the ancient town's.

History

Ietas was mentioned by Philistus as a fortress, and it is called by Thucydides a fortress of the Siculians, which was taken by Gylippus on his march from Himera through the interior of the island towards Syracuse. It first appears as an independent city in the time of Pyrrhus, and was attacked by that monarch on account of its strong position and the advantages it offered for operations against Panormus; but the inhabitants readily capitulated. In the First Punic War it was occupied by a Carthaginian garrison, but after the fall of Panormus drove out these troops and opened its gates to the Romans. Under the Roman government it appears as a municipal town, but not one of much importance. The Ietini are only noticed in passing by Cicero among the towns whose lands had been utterly ruined by the exactions of Verres; and the Ietenses are enumerated by Pliny among the populi stipendiarii of the interior of Sicily. The town minted coins in antiquity, examples of which survive.

The position of Ietas is very obscurely intimated in ancient sources, but it appears from Diodorus that it was not very remote from Panormus, and that its site was one of great natural strength. Silius Italicus also alludes to its elevated situation. Fazello assures us that there was a mediaeval fortress called Iato on the summit of a lofty mountain, about 25 km from Palermo, and 20 km north of Entella, which was destroyed by Frederick II at the same time as the latter city; and this he identified as the site of Ietas.  The mountain is still called Monte Iato (or Monte Jato or Monte di Iato), though formerly known as Monte di San Cosmano, from a church on its summit.

The toponym "Jato" or "Iato" is a reflection of the ancient name.

References

Ancient cities in Sicily
Former populated places in Italy
Populated places established in the 6th century BC
Archaeological sites in Sicily